Flint Hills Technical College (FHTC) is a public community college in Emporia, Kansas, United States.

History
The college was founded in 1963 by the Emporia School District. FHTC was transferred to the Kansas Board of Regents in July 1999, and separated from the Emporia School District in 2004.

Governance
The college is governed by the Kansas Board of Regents. It is overseen by a board of trustees made up of 7 community members. The board is responsible for the development and operation of FHTC.

Notable alumni
 Clint Bowyer, NASCAR driver

See also
 List of colleges and universities in Kansas

References

External links
 

Public universities and colleges in Kansas
Technological universities in the United States
Education in Lyon County, Kansas
Emporia, Kansas
Buildings and structures in Lyon County, Kansas
Two-year colleges in the United States
Educational institutions established in 1963
1963 establishments in Kansas